Bathybagrus platycephalus is a species of claroteid catfish endemic to Lake Tanganyika on the border of Burundi, the Democratic Republic of the Congo, Tanzania, and Zambia. It grows to a length of 22.0 cm (8.7 inches) TL and is a component of local fisheries.

References

 

Claroteidae
Fish of Africa
Fish described in 1936
Taxa named by E. Barton Worthington
Taxa named by Kate Bertram
Taxonomy articles created by Polbot
Taxobox binomials not recognized by IUCN